The City of Greater Bendigo is a local government area in Victoria, Australia, located in the central part of the state. It includes the city of Bendigo and the towns of Axedale, Elmore, Heathcote, Marong, Raywood and Strathfieldsaye. It was formed in 1994 from the amalgamation of the former City of Bendigo with the Borough of Eaglehawk, Shire of Strathfieldsaye, Shire of Huntly, Rural City of Marong and parts of the Shire of McIvor. It is the state’s third largest economy base and is considered a service and infrastructure centre for north central Victoria. The city is surrounded by 40,000 hectares of regional, state and national parkland.

The city is governed and administered by the Greater Bendigo City Council; its seat of local government and administrative centre is located at the council headquarters in Bendigo, it also has service centres located in Heathcote, Huntly, Marong and a couple of other locations within Bendigo. The city is named after the main urban settlement lying in the centre-west of the LGA, that is Bendigo, which is also the LGA's most populous urban area with a population of 99,122.

Council

Current composition
The council is composed of three wards and nine councillors, with three councillors per ward elected to represent each ward. The most recent election was held in October 2020.

Administration and governance
The council meets in the council chambers at the council headquarters in the Bendigo Town Hall offices, which is also the location of the council's administrative activities. It also provides customer services at its administrative centre on Lyttleton Terrace in Bendigo and its service centres in Heathcote, Huntly and Marong and also on Hopetoun Street and St Andrews Avenue in Bendigo.

Townships and localities
The 2021 census, the city had a population of 121,470 up from 110,477 in the 2016 census

^ - Territory divided with another LGA

See also 
 List of localities (Victoria)

References

External links
 
 Greater Bendigo City Council official website
 Bendigo information and community site
 Metlink local public transport profile
 Link to Land Victoria interactive maps

Local government areas of Victoria (Australia)
Loddon Mallee (region)
 
Bendigo
North Central Victoria